John B. Martin may refer to:

John Bartlow Martin (1915–1987), US ambassador and author
John Biddulph Martin, president of the Royal Statistical Society 1896–1897
John Blennerhassett Martin, artist who painted James Armistead

See also 
John Martin (disambiguation)